The Calizas y margas de Xert Formation or Xert Formation is an Early Cretaceous (late Barremian) geologic formation of the Maestrazgo and Galve Basins in central-eastern Spain. The formation is described as a coastal claystone, with indications of a transgressive episode, marked by the transition from marsh facies, with little marine influence, to marine platform facies evidenced by abundant marine invertebrates.

Fossil content 
Dinosaurs
 Tastavinsaurus sanzi

Invertebrates
 Bivalvia indet.
 Gastropoda indet.

Flora
 Plantae indet.

Correlation

See also 

 List of dinosaur-bearing rock formations
 List of stratigraphic units with few dinosaur genera

References

Bibliography

Further reading 
 G. Cuenca Bescós, O. Amo, J. L. Barco, J. I. Canudo, R. Royo Torres and J. I. Ruiz Omeñaca. 1999. Dinosaurios de Aragón [Dinosaurs of Aragon]. Zubía 17:235-257

Geologic formations of Spain
Lower Cretaceous Series of Europe
Cretaceous Spain
Barremian Stage
Shale formations
Limestone formations
Marl formations
Chert
Paludal deposits
Shallow marine deposits
Open marine deposits
Geography of the Province of Teruel
Formations